The 1947–48 season was the 75th season of competitive football in Scotland and the 51st season of the Scottish Football League.

Scottish League Division A

Champions: Hibernian 
Relegated: Airdrie, Queen's Park

Scottish League Division B

Champions: East Fife, Albion Rovers 
Relegated: Leith Athletic

Scottish League Division C

Champions: East Stirlingshire

Cup honours

Other honours

National

County

 * – aggregate over two legs
  – replay

Highland League

Scotland national team

Key:
 (H) = Home match
 (A) = Away match
 BHC = British Home Championship

Notes and references

External links
Scottish Football Historical Archive

 
Seasons in Scottish football